Adam Richmond Davidson (28 November 1929 – September 2007) was a Scottish footballer who played in the Football League as a winger for Colchester United.

Career
Born in Invergowrie, Davidson joined Football League club Sheffield Wednesday from Elmwood, but failed to make an appearance for the Owls. He moved to Colchester United in 1951, spending one season with the club and making 19 appearances. He made his debut on 13 September 1951 against Plymouth Argyle in a 1–0 win at Layer Road. He scored one goal for the club in the FA Cup against Bristol CIty on 15 December, a match which Colchester won 2–1. His final game came at the end of the 1951–52 season in a 1–0 home victory against Watford. He later returned to his native Scotland to play for Carnoustie Panmure. He died in Portsmouth in September 2007, at the age of 77.

References

1929 births
2007 deaths
Footballers from Perth and Kinross
Scottish footballers
Association football wingers
Sheffield Wednesday F.C. players
Colchester United F.C. players
Carnoustie Panmure F.C. players
English Football League players